The Girlie Show was the fourth concert tour by American singer and songwriter Madonna, in support of her fifth studio album, Erotica (1992). In October 1992, Madonna simultaneously released Erotica and the coffee table book Sex. The former ended up being Madonna's lowest selling album at the time, while the latter received extensive media attention, and backlash from fans and critics; nonetheless, it was commercially successful. After the critical and commercial failure of the erotic thriller Body of Evidence starring Madonna, the tour was announced in July 1993. According to some critics, it was the singer's way to "revive" her music career following the negative reaction to the thriller. The tour took its name after an Edward Hopper painting titled "Girlie Show". Madonna's brother, Christopher Ciccone, was appointed tour director.

Like her previous Blond Ambition World Tour (1990), the concert was divided into different thematic sections: Dominatrix, Studio 54, Weimar Cabaret, and an encore. Madonna opened the show dressed as a dominatrix surrounded by topless dancers, while lighter moments included her descending from the ceiling on a giant disco ball wearing an Afro wig for "Express Yourself" (1989), as well as singing "Like a Virgin" (1984) in the guise of actress Marlene Dietrich. It began in London on September 25, 1993, and ended in Tokyo on December 19 of the same year. The 39-date tour marked the first time the singer visited places such as Turkey, Israel, Mexico, Puerto Rico, Argentina, Brazil and Australia. The Girlie Show received generally positive reviews from critics, who agreed that despite the controversy surrounding the singer, she could still please her audience. Upon completion, it was reported to have grossed US$70 million.

Several organizations in different countries protested to force the cancellation of the concerts, due to their explicit sexual nature. In Puerto Rico, Madonna passed the island's flag between her legs on stage, resulting in outrage among Puerto Rican society. A number of concerts were recorded and broadcast, with the show on November 19, 1993, in Sydney, Australia being aired as a special on HBO; the following year, it was released on video under the title The Girlie Show: Live Down Under. The concerts in Fukuoka, Japan were also filmed, but broadcast exclusively on Japanese television.

Background

In October 1992, Madonna released simultaneously her fifth studio album Erotica, and her coffee table book Sex. Consisting of sexually provocative and explicit images, photographed by Steven Meisel, the book was met with a strongly negative reaction from the media and the general public, but was commercially successful. The widespread backlash overshadowed Erotica which, despite positive reviews, ended up as the singer's lowest selling album at the time; Madonna continued her provocative imagery in the 1993 erotic thriller Body of Evidence, a film which contains scenes of sadomasochism and bondage but it was critically panned and a commercial failure. On July 9, 1993, The Philadelphia Inquirer announced that Madonna would embark on The Girlie Show, a new concert tour. Some critics suggested that the tour was as an attempt by the singer to "revive" her musical career after Body of Evidence. Madonna's inspiration for the tour was a painting by Edward Hopper of the same name, depicting a burlesque dancer.

The tour was set to kick off at London's Wembley Stadium on September 25, 1993. Madonna then said she was "not interested in preaching to the converted", hence why she decided to begin The Girlie Show in London; "I am going to the places where I have the most enemies", she explained. It was initially planned not to visit the United States, instead focusing on regions the singer had never toured before, such as Turkey, Israel, Mexico, Puerto Rico, Argentina, Brazil and Australia. However, due to demand, some shows were booked in certain US cities. A concert in Beijing's Workers' Stadium was also planned; the official China News Agency reported that she would be allowed to perform as long as there wasn't include any "indecent exposure" in the show. Madonna allegedly agreed, since she was interested in visiting the country. However, said concert never happened. A promotional extended play, titled The Girlie Show, containing all six singles from Erotica, was released in Brazil to commemorate the singer's visit. Similarly, limited editions of Erotica and The Immaculate Collection (1990) were released exclusively in Australia. The tour was then chronicled in a photo book of the same name, released in November 1994. This release included a CD with three live tracks: "Like a Virgin", "In This Life", and "Why's It So Hard". Madonna wrote in the book:
"When I finished the Blond Ambition tour, I swore on my life that I would never even think of going on tour again as long as I lived. I was spent. I was exhausted. I was sick of traveling. I wanted stability. So, I threw myself into making movies, recording a new album, and I also put out a book called Sex. So much for stability.

Needless to say, as rewarding as all these creative endeavors were to me, they could not take the place of performing live. Theater is my life--or is my life theater? I'm not sure and it really doesn't matter. Being on stage is where I feel most alive, and it's where I'm able to pull all of my creative energies into one outlet. It's the only place where I can combine all of my influences and all of my inspirations into one living, breathing animal. The stage is the only environment where cubist painting, burlesque, flamenco dancing and the circus can live together under one cozy roof. Taking the adventure one step further is to play in front of a different audience every night. dealing with different cultures, different expectations, different ways of expressing pleasure and bewilderment--this to me is the ultimate thrill. The ultimate risk. And I love taking risks. You may have heard that about me. There's no way this book could truly recapture the excitement of the "Girlie Show", but it comes pretty damn close.

By the way, if you ever hear me say, "I'm never going on tour again", don't believe me."

Development

In early 1993, Madonna contacted her brother Christopher Ciccone, who had worked with her on Blond Ambition, and appointed him tour director; besides directing, Ciccone was also in charge of supervising the crew, designing the stage set, and handling all the dancers. Auditions for dancers took place in Los Angeles; an ad was displayed for "androgynous boyish girls with very short hair". The singer said about the hiring process:
"First I had choreographed stuff I had them do. Then I asked them to dance and improvise, whatever the music moved them to do. Then I called back all the people who looked good and could really dance and I asked each of them to tell a joke or an amusing story. If they were really embarrassed and couldn't do it I didn't pick them. Then the ones that were left, I asked them if they would shave their heads. Not that I was going to shave their heads. I just wanted to see how far they were willing to go for me".
Madonna and Ciccone decided to work with five different choreographers, one of them being American actor Gene Kelly, whom the singer wanted to choreograph the performance of single "Rain". However, tension soon arose as Kelly was uncomfortable with the dancers; he believed they had been selected based on personality rather than for their abilities as dancers. He also wasn't too fond of the show's "heavy sexual overtones", according to Ciccone. Feeling Kelly's position wasn't working out, Ciccone convinced the singer to fire him; eventually, Madonna, "shamefaced at having single-handedly conceived of such a terrible fate for this venerable American icon", agreed with her brother and dismissed Kelly. Alex Magno was then appointed one of The Girlie Show's main choreographers. For the show's main theme, Madonna and her brother agreed on a "burlesque circus" and, for inspiration, would watch Bollywood films, Thai dance numbers, Carol Reed's Trapeze (1956), as well as the work of Marlene Dietrich, Louise Brooks, Erté, and Zizi Jeanmaire. Like Blond Ambition, The Girlie Show was divided into four different thematic acts: Dominatrix, Studio 54, Weimar Cabaret, and an encore.

The wardrobe was in charge of fashion designer duo Dolce & Gabbana; Madonna gave them instructions to watch a number of films, including My Fair Lady (1964) and Cabaret (1972), to bring to life the "striptease, Vegas type of show" she envisioned. 1,500 costumes were created for the tour's troupe, that ranged from dominatrix boots, a sequined bra, and a Victorian-inspired dress to a simple white tank-top and cut-off denim shorts. Domenico Dolce recalled that "both Madonna and I share a Fellinian version of the circus, but we also like those glamorous costumes that you can see in the movies from the '50s"; the duo agreed on "perfection" being the biggest challenge they encountered while working with the singer. The designers would "redo" the stuff that would rip or come apart during the tour; "We followed the tour this way. From time, shorts and other things were missing. We followed the tour and assisted Madonna, despite being always in Milan", they explained.

The show had a more complex stage than those from Madonna's previous tours; it included a catwalk that extended from the main stage and led out towards the audience, and two hydraulic risers that rose from beneath the stage to elevated platforms and several smaller balconies. A large illuminated sign reading "Girlie Show" was hung above the stage. Two huge drawings, portraying the face of Madonna hidden behind a black mask, were placed on the sides. Two aircraft were needed to ferry the tour around Europe, including the largest Soviet transport plane ever made; it took four full days and 100 employees to assemble the stage, with one additional day for the setting up of production. During MTV Australia's special Girlie Talk, Madonna commented about having her hair cut before the tour: "my hair was hot pink. I went through this Pippi Longstocking phase where I just had to have, like, pink red hair and braids [...] and when I dyed my hair of all these crazy colors [...] I tried to make it blond again, [but it] started to break off everywhere so I kind of gave myself a haircut whatever I like it or not. For the tour I wanted something clean and after I cut all the dancers' hairs I was trying to decide what I wanted to do with my hair and I thought of having it dark like in my 'Rain' video, but then I didn't want to have the same color hairs of all the dancers, so I shortened and kept this color."

Concert synopsis

The concert was divided into four different thematic sections: Dominatrix, Studio 54, Weimar Cabaret, and an encore. It began with a calliope fanfare as a pierrot – who made several cameos later – appeared on stage. This was followed by a topless dancer sliding down a 20-foot pole high above the stage. Then, Madonna emerged as a short-haired dominatrix, wearing a black sequined ensemble consisting of jacket, bra, hot pants, elbow-length gloves, knee-high boots, and domino mask while brandishing a crop to perform "Erotica"; her dancers posing suggestively in the background. The next number was "Fever", which Madonna performed alongside half-naked male dancers. Towards the end, the singer and the two men disappeared in a flamed circle on the stage. The third song, "Vogue", featured Madonna wearing an elaborate Asian beaded headdress and engaging in a Thai-inspired choreography. For "Rain", Madonna and back-up singers and dancers Niki Haris and Donna De Lory wore long see-through black robes and sat on stools in the center of the stage. An instrumental interlude closed the act: the pierrot, along with several dancers dressed in black and twirling umbrellas, did a choreography reminiscent of the 1952 musical film Singin' in the Rain.

The Studio 54 act began with "Express Yourself"; a distorted voice from off-stage claimed "I'm gonna take you to a place you've never been before". Then, Madonna descended from the ceiling on a giant disco ball, wearing a blond afro wig, 1970's style halters and royal blue Bell-bottom pants. She was joined by Haris and De Lory in similar outfits. The end of the performance was connected to the next song, "Deeper and Deeper", which featured a male member from the audience jumping onstage, seemingly trying to dance with a startled Madonna, ripping off his tearaway pants and revealing himself as one of the dancers from the show. "Why's It So Hard" saw Madonna simulating an orgy with all the dancers, while "In This Life", the act's final song, saw her singing alone on the stage while being watched by the pierrot from afar. The show's second interlude, "The Beast Within", featured two men doing an apocalyptic dance with sexual overtones as Madonna, from off-stage, recited the lyrics.

"Like a Virgin" opened the Weimar Cabaret segment: Madonna wore top hat and a tailcoat while singing in the guise of actress Marlene Dietrich, pronouncing the word "virgin" as "wirgin". "Bye Bye Baby" saw Madonna, Haris, and De Lory performing with three scantily clad women in a choreographed, highly sexual routine. "I'm Going Bananas" was then sung in "Judy Holliday/Betty Boop/Cyndi Lauper-ish vocals." For the next number, "La Isla Bonita", Madonna removed the tailcoat, and performed in a blue and white striped shirt. She sang on top of a rising platform while one of the musicians walked around bare-chested playing the acoustic guitar. The final song before the encore was "Holiday"; it featured Madonna and the dancers wearing long trenchcoats and doing a military parade while an American flag was hung in the background. The final numbers were "Justify My Love" and a mashup of Sly and the Family Stone's "Everybody Is a Star" (1969) and Madonna's own "Everybody": the former had the singer and dancers wearing Victorian costumes and her holding a lorgnette, and the latter saw them change into white tops and denim shorts. Afterwards, as a red curtain fell and carnival music played, the pierrot emerged yet again, only to reveal its identity as Madonna herself. The singer closed the show by singing the phrase "Everybody is a Star" as the curtain fell once again.

Critical response

The Girlie Show was generally well received by critics. In his book Madonna: An Intimate Biography, J. Randy Taraborrelli wrote: "While still sexy, it was still more of an innocent burlesque rather than a blatant attempt to shock [...] this concert had the feeling of a racy Barnum and Baileys circus", and praised it for revealing a "softer" side of the singer. On a similar note, Gar Graff from the Detroit Free Press noted the tour revealed a more personal side to Madonna than her previous tours; he called it a "stylish, theatrical [...] sophisticated, tightly scripted, two hour cabaret." Thom Duffy from Billboard said the tour "transcended its own playfully erotic hype and earned kudos as pure entertainment", also noticing a "sense of humor and burlesque" that the Blond Ambition World Tour lacked. Duffy concluded that, despite the controversy surrounding Madonna at the time, she could still "confound and excite her audience." Similarly, Richard Corliss, writing for Time, expressed that "Madonna, once the Harlow harlot and now a perky harlequin, is the greatest show-off on earth", and deemed the tour "at once a movie retrospective, a Ziegfeld revue, a living video, an R-rated take off on Cirque du Soleil."

Paul Taylor from The Independent was positive on his review of the show's opening night at London; "her performance-which featured spanking, four-letter outbursts and suggestive references to oral sex and the size of one dancer's manhood clearly delighted most of her fans." Also of the opening night, Entertainment Weeklys Tyler Brule commented that "Madonna may have lost some of her glitter lately. But as she demonstrated in the kickoff of her Girlie Show tour at London's Wembley Stadium, she hasn't forgotten the twin pillars of her success—how to put on a show, and how to make a buck." Frances Hubbard from the Daily Express opined that the singer is "at her worst when she turns moody and pretentious" and that "if Madonna is on her way down, it's a gentle descent. The world's best-marketed pop goddess will be around for a while yet." In his review at the show at New York's Madison Square Garden, Jon Pareles from The New York Times noted that "after the proudly uningratiating 'Blond Ambition' tour in 1990 [...] 'The Girlie Show' tweaks fewer taboos." Pareles pointed out that the singer "sings just enough solo parts to prove she's not lip-synching", concluding that with Blond Ambition she was "pop's least flirtatious sex symbol", but was "likeable again" on The Girlie Show. The Los Angeles Timess Jeff Kaye wrote that "despite the scanty costumes adorning the star and her troupe of singers and dancers, and the liberal doses of group groping and gender-bending, there wasn't anything that could be called shocking [...] there was a sense that this adoring crowd had seen and heard all this stuff before."

However, not all reviews were positive. The British press took what Kaye called a "mean-spirited stance" against the singer and the tour; after she arrived in London, a British magazine proclaimed itself a "Madonna-Free Zone", refusing to publish or show any pictures of the concerts. Bruce Elder from The Sydney Morning Herald gave a mixed review; "the best that could be said [...] was that it was an event, an occasion, a place to be seen at, but as pure dance, pop or rock entertainment, it was nothing special." He also wondered if the singer was "really committed to celebrating sexual liberation or [did she] simply hijacked sadomasochism and homosexuality in the name of good old American capitalism." Elder further noticed a "kind of coldness and distance" in the performances and pointed out "too many flat spots [...] to make this a truly memorable concert." More negative was The Washington Posts Tom Shales, who wrote that "her attempts now to shock and titillate have become belabored self-parodies [...] Madonna's 'Girlie Show' is silly, not shocking." On their rankings of Madonna's tours, The Advocates Gina Vivinetto and VH1's Christopher Rosa placed The Girlie Show in the fourth and fifth position, respectively. The Odyssey's Rocco Papa considered it Madonna's best concert tour: "Not only did [The Girlie Show] feature some of the best staging of Madonna's career, it was also impeccable musically [...] She also displayed a happiness and warmth to the audience that made this show stand out".

Commercial reception
The Girlie Show proved to be commercially successful. In London, 15,000 tickets were sold within two hours, while the opening night was attended by 72,000 people. Madonna's very first concert in Israel attracted an audience of 50,000 people. The three shows at New York City's Madison Square Garden grossed US$2,020,475 million, while the three Mexican concerts grossed $8,927,703 million; prices ranged from $28.13 to $125. The first show at Argentina's River Plate Stadium saw the singer playing to an audience of 50,000. In Brazil, she broke attendance records: 86,000 and 120,000 people attended the concerts in São Paulo and Rio de Janeiro, respectively. It remains the second largest crowd ever on Rio's Maracanã Stadium for a concert by a female artist, behind Tina Turner's 1988 Break Every Rule World Tour (attended by 188,000 people). The average ticket price for the shows was $15.

In Australia, Madonna set the record for the biggest ticket sales with over 360,000 tickets sold; the first date sold 52,000 tickets in an hour and 20 minutes, with prices ranging from $45 to $142. The single concert at the Adelaide Oval attracted over 40,000 people, standing as one of the most attended concerts in the venue's history. The dates in Melbourne and Sydney sold 147,241 and 135,000 tickets, respectively. In Sydney, over 90,000 tickets were sold in an hour. Billboard then reported that the eight Australian concerts had grossed over US$18.5 million. Upon completion, the tour was reported to have grossed a total of $70 million from 39 concerts.

Controversies

Like previous Madonna tours, The Girlie Show was subject to controversy. One planned concert in Frankfurt was condemned by a German politician who declared it "exceeded the bounds of decency" and should be banned to those under 16. Norbert Geis, parliamentary spokesman for Chancellor Helmut Kohl's party, had previously warned: "Either Madonna drops these obscenities... or she will not be allowed to appear". The concert ended up being cancelled, with the organizers citing "technical difficulties" as the reason. Trouble in Israel occurred when Orthodox Jews staged protests to force the cancellation of the singer's first show in the country; Avraham Ravitz, from the Torah Judaism Party, expressed that "this is a holy land [...] people from all over the world did not move here in order to see this human garbage". However, rallies were unsuccessful as the sold-out show went on as scheduled.

In Puerto Rico, certain groups feared Madonna's influence over teenagers and demanded the concert's cancellation. During the show, Madonna held a small Puerto Rican flag to her bosom and then slipped it slowly through her legs. This was met with backlash: the leader of the Independence Party called the act "an infamy without parallel in the history of our country"; Governor Pedro Rosselló described it as "an unfortunate incident", and urged the people from the country to repudiate the singer. Senator Enrique Rodríguez Negrón filed a censure resolution, which was rejected by President of the legislature Roberto Rexach Benítez. Representative David Noriega called Madonna "vulgar and insensitive", and accused her of abusing the country's hospitality. Luis de Rosa, president of the Puerto Rican Chamber of Commerce of South Florida, said Madonna "has no right to go to someone's homeland and pass their flag through her private parts". The chamber and other Puerto Rican groups urged Hispanic citizens to gather outside the singer's Miami home to wave Puerto Rican flags and destroy her records; about 30 people showed up. Madonna's supporters claimed she meant no harm, and had simply put the flag there because she couldn't find her pocket.

More controversy arose in Argentina; cardinal Antonio Quarracino, archbishop of Buenos Aires, called the singer "blasphemous and pornographic" and asked then-president Carlos Menem not to receive her. Additionally, Bishop Osvaldo Musto called for a cancellation and recommended confession for any practicing Catholic who attended the concerts elsewise. Jorge María Storni, president of the organization Tradición, Familia y Propiedad, supported the cancellation of the concerts, since according to his words, Madonna's main goal was to "undermine the foundations of social order". Alexander Molinas ―consultant of Menores e Incapaces de la Cámara Civil― went as far as to ask civil judge Marcela Perez Pardo to ban the shows because they threatened "intimacy and religious conscience"; the request was dismissed but the judge did order that anyone under 13 be accompanied by an adult.

In Mexico, an anti-abortion organization urged Interior Ministry officials to deny the singer's entry to the country. A spokesman dismissed this request and explained that there was no reason to deny her a visa. Pro Life President Jorge Serrano Limón said Madonna was mocking the Catholic people, and that those attending the concerts did not have "the right to publicly mock the moral and religious values of Catholics or the patriotic values of Mexicans". Additionally, social communicologist Nino Canún presented a television special called ¿Y usted qué opina? (English: So what's your opinion?), where the audience, among them a priest, presented their arguments as to why "this morally clueless singer shouldn't be allowed to perform in the country". A ministry official dismissed the controversy by saying that "whoever likes it can go [to the concert] and whoever doesn't, well don't go". Later, during the concert, Madonna wore a sombrero and simulated an orgy as response.

Upon Madonna's arrival in Australia, controversy aroused when she was given by Michael Gudinski, one of the promoters of the tour's Australian leg, a didgeridoo, a traditional instrument among the Aboriginals  which is allowed to be played only by men; "the fact [Madonna] is a Westerner and the didgeridoo as a gift does not change the fact she should not be carrying it around", said Badangthun Munmunyarrun, an Aboriginal elder. Gudinski later explained that he was working with Yothu Yindi at the time, and presented Madonna with the didgeridoo Yindi had given him, but planned to get the instrument back from her and replace it with a new one. In 2015, Madonna confirmed she still had the didgeridoo.

Broadcasts and recordings

Cashbox magazine reported on November 6, 1993 that one of the shows at the Sydney Cricket Ground stadium would be broadcast through HBO on November 20; this marked the second time Madonna worked with the network following the Blond Ambition broadcast three years earlier. Initially, Madonna intended to film the tour in Argentina or Mexico, but she ultimately chose Australia instead, as she liked the event being billed as "Madonna Down Under". On November 13, 1993, Billboard reported Westwood One would do a simultaneous broadcast of the special; it officially aired on HBO as Madonna Live Down Under: The Girlie Show. HBO started its broadcast from Club USA in New York City, leading to the concert itself. With a 17.0 rating and 27 share overall, it became the network's second most-watched original program of the year, following the George Foreman vs. Tommy Morrison fight.

On April 26, 1994, the special was released on LaserDisc and VHS under the title The Girlie Show: Live Down Under. It earned Madonna a nomination for Best Long Form Music Video at the 37th Annual Grammy Awards and peaked at number 31 and 32 on Billboards Year-end Top Music Videos and Top Video Sales charts, respectively. In addition to the official release, British radio station BBC Radio 1 broadcast the London show on December 26, 1993. The concerts in Fukuoka, Japan were filmed and aired exclusively on Japanese television.

Set list 
Set list and samples adapted per Madonna's official website and the liner notes of The Girlie Show: Live Down Under.

Act 1: Dominatrix
 "The Girlie Show Theme" 
 "Erotica" 
 "Fever" 
 "Vogue"
 "Rain" 
Act 2: Studio 54
 "Express Yourself"
 "Deeper and Deeper" 
 "Why's It So Hard"
 "In This Life"
 "The Beast Within" 
Act 3: Weimar Cabaret
 "Like a Virgin" 
 "Bye Bye Baby"
 "I'm Going Bananas"
 "La Isla Bonita"
 "Holiday" 
Act 4: Encore
 "Justify My Love" 
 "Everybody Is a Star" / "Everybody"

Tour dates

Cancelled dates

Personnel
Adapted from The Girlie Show program.

Band 
Madonna – creator, vocals
Niki Haris - vocals
Donna De Lory - vocals
Jai Winding - keyboards
Michael Bearden - keyboards
Paul Pesco - guitar
Victor Bailey - bass
Omar Hakim - drums
Luis Conte - percussion
Mike McKnight - additional keyboards

Dancers 
Ungela Brockman - dancer
Christopher Childers - dancer
Michael Gregory - dancer
Carrie Ann Inaba - dancer
Jill Nicklaus - dancer
Ruthy Inchaustegui - dancer
Luca Tommassini - dancer
Carlton Wilborn - dancer

Choreographers 
Alex Magno - choreographer
Keith Young - choreographer
Michelle Johnston - choreographer
Niki Haris - choreographer

Wardrobe and crew 
Dolce & Gabbana - designers
Rob Saduski - designer
Christopher Ciccone - production designer
Jai Winding - musical director
Jeffrey Hornaday - stage director
Peter Morse - lighting director

Notes

References

Citations

Bibliography

External links

Madonna.com > Tours > The Girlie Show

Madonna concert tours
1993 concert tours